Aleksandr Suvorov was a  of Soviet Navy.

Development and design 

The Sverdlov-class cruisers, Soviet designation Project 68bis, were the last conventional gun cruisers built for the Soviet Navy. They were built in the 1950s and were based on Soviet, German, and Italian designs and concepts developed prior to the Second World War. They were modified to improve their sea keeping capabilities, allowing them to run at high speed in the rough waters of the North Atlantic. The basic hull was more modern and had better armor protection than the vast majority of the post Second World War gun cruiser designs built and deployed by peer nations. They also carried an extensive suite of modern radar equipment and anti-aircraft artillery. The Soviets originally planned to build 40 ships in the class, which would be supported by the s and aircraft carriers.

The Sverdlov class displaced 13,600 tons standard and 16,640 tons at full load. The hull was a completely welded new design and the ships had a double bottom for over 75% of their length. The ship also had twenty-three watertight bulkheads. The Sverdlovs had six boilers providing steam to two shaft geared steam turbines generating .

Sverdlov-class cruisers main armament included twelve /57 cal B-38 guns mounted in four triple Mk5-bis turrets. They also had twelve /56 cal Model 1934 guns in six twin SM-5-1 mounts. For anti-aircraft weaponry, the cruisers had thirty-two  anti-aircraft guns in sixteen twin mounts and were also equipped with ten  torpedo tubes in two mountings of five each.

The Sverdlovs had  belt armor and had a  armored deck. The turrets were shielded by  armor and the conning tower, by  armor.

The cruisers' ultimate radar suite included one 'Big Net' or 'Top Trough' air search radar, one 'High Sieve' or 'Low Sieve' air search radar, one 'Knife Rest' air search radar and one 'Slim Net' air search radar. For navigational radar they had one 'Don-2' or 'Neptune' model. For fire control purposes the ships were equipped with two 'Sun Visor' radars, two 'Top Bow' 152 mm gun radars and eight 'Egg Cup' gun radars. For electronic countermeasures the ships were equipped with two 'Watch Dog' ECM systems.

Construction and career
Aleksandr Suvorov was laid down on 29 September 1951 at Baltic Shipyard, Leningrad and launched on 15 May 1952. The vessel was commissioned on 31 December 1953. On 18 February 1954, she entered the 8th Navy. From 12 to 17 October 1955, the cruiser visited to Portsmouth, United Kingdom. On 24 December 1955, she was transferred to the DKBF. On 27 February 1956, the vessel was transferred to the KSF.

From 26–31 May 1981, Aleksandr Suvorov visited Aden, Yemen. On 1 December 1986, the cruiser was decommissioned from the Navy, mothballed and laid up. On 15 December 1989, the vessel was ordered disarmed and on 19 April 1990 she was stricken. In November 1991, Aleksandr Suvorov was sold to a private Indian firm for scrap in India.

Pennant numbers

Gallery

References

External links 

 Photo gallery

1952 ships
Ships of the Soviet Union
Ships built at the Baltic Shipyard
Naval ships of the Soviet Union
Sverdlov-class cruisers
Cold War cruisers of the Soviet Union